Telling Lies in America is a 1997 period coming-of-age drama set film directed by Guy Ferland and written by Joe Eszterhas.

Plot
Karchy Jonas is a 17-year-old high-school student and emigrant from Hungary trying to find his way in the world. He meets radio personality Billy Magic who takes him under his wing. However, authorities are after Billy for accepting payola from record companies to give their songs air time. Billy picks Karchy, as when he figures out Karchy cheated to win his radio contest, he realizes he would be perfect to associate with Magic's scam. Karchy does so, not realizing that this may jeopardize him and his father's U.S. citizenship. He pursues a co-worker at a local grocery store where he works, only to find out she was engaged all along. Karchy idolizes Billy only to find out how corrupted, bitter and cynical he truly is.

Cast

Production
Eszterhas wrote the film in 1983 under the title Magic Man but could not sell it. Eventually his wife Naomi read the script and suggested he revisit it. "It was so moving, so good, I couldn't believe it hadn't been made," she said. "I thought it was too good to be sitting on a shelf. I thought the relationship between Karchy (the protagonist) and his father wasn't entirely worked out."

Eszterhas rewrote the script and sold it to Banner Entertainment. The writer gave up his $100,000 fee so Max Schell could play a role.

According to the website Splitsider, actor John Candy was considered for the role of Billy Magic.

The film was shot in 24 days during August 1996 in Cleveland, Ohio.

Reception
Telling Lies in America received mixed to positive reviews from critics. It holds a 61% approval rating on Rotten Tomatoes, based on 18 reviews, with an average rating of 5.93/10. On Metacritic, the film has a weighted average score of 65 out of 100, based on 20 critics, indicating "generally favorable reviews".

Box office
The film was released in limited release opened at #22 at the North American box office and grossed $11,470. The film would end with a domestic gross of $318,809.

Accolades 
The film won awarded with a Special Recognition for Excellence in Filmmaking at the National Board of Review Awards in 1997.

Home media
The film was released in DVD on April 25, 2000. The film was released as part of a Blu-ray Disc double feature with Traveller from Shout! Factory on May 29, 2012.

References

External links
 
 
 
 

1997 films
1997 drama films
1997 independent films
1990s coming-of-age drama films
American coming-of-age drama films
Films directed by Guy Ferland
Films about radio people
Films set in Cleveland
Films set in the 1960s
Films shot in Cleveland
Films with screenplays by Joe Eszterhas
1990s English-language films
1990s American films